Trevor Scott Oaks (born March 26, 1993) is an American former professional baseball pitcher. He was drafted by the Los Angeles Dodgers in the 7th round of the 2014 MLB Draft. He played one season in Major League Baseball (MLB) in 2018 for the Kansas City Royals.

Career
Oaks attended Woodcrest Christian High School in Riverside, California. He played one season of college baseball at Biola University. He then transferred to California Baptist University where he played for one season, with a 10-0 record and 1.68 ERA in 15 starts. He was drafted by the Los Angeles Dodgers in the 7th round of the 2014 MLB Draft, and signed for a signing bonus of $161,600.

Los Angeles Dodgers
Oaks began his professional career with the Ogden Raptors in 2014, where he was 5–2 with a 6.81 ERA in 14 games. In 2015, he pitched in 23 games (21 starts) between the Great Lakes Loons and the Rancho Cucamonga Quakes and had an 8–5 record and 2.65 ERA.  

For the 2016 season, he pitched in four games for the Quakes, and 10 each for the Tulsa Drillers and Oklahoma City Dodgers, with a 14–3 record and 2.74 ERA. In 2017, he made 15 starts (and one relief appearance) for Oklahoma City and was 4–3 with a 3.64 ERA. His season was cut short by an oblique injury suffered in July. The Dodgers added him to the 40-man roster on November 20, 2017.

Kansas City Royals
On January 4, 2018, Oaks was traded to the Kansas City Royals in a three-team trade that  also sent Jake Peter and Scott Alexander to the Dodgers, Joakim Soria and Luis Avilán to the Chicago White Sox, and Erick Mejia to the Royals. He was recalled by the Royals on April 28, 2018, to make his major league debut as the starting pitcher against the White Sox. With AAA Omaha, he was 8-8 with a 3.23 ERA in 128.1 innings in 22 starts. With the Royals in 2018, he was 0-2 with a 7.24 ERA in 13.2 innings.

Oaks missed the 2019 season after undergoing surgery to repair the labrum in his right hip. On October 29, Oaks was outrighted off the Royals roster.

San Francisco Giants
On November 5, 2019, Oaks was claimed off waivers by the San Francisco Giants. On January 16, 2020, Oaks was designated for assignment. He was sent outright to the Triple-A Sacramento River Cats on January 24. Oaks did not play in a game in 2020 due to the cancellation of the minor league season because of the COVID-19 pandemic. On December 20, 2020, Oaks was released by the Giants.

In an interview on January 31, 2022, Oaks acknowledged that he had retired from professional baseball since his release from the Giants organization.

References

External links

1993 births
Living people
Baseball players from Riverside, California
Major League Baseball pitchers
Kansas City Royals players
Biola Eagles baseball players
Biola University alumni
California Baptist Lancers baseball players
Arizona League Dodgers players
Ogden Raptors players
Great Lakes Loons players
Rancho Cucamonga Quakes players
Tulsa Drillers players
Oklahoma City Dodgers players
Omaha Storm Chasers players
Surprise Saguaros players